Wool Market (also Woolmarket) is an unincorporated community in Harrison County, Mississippi.

Historically, the settlement was called "Wool Market", though presently, the one-word "Woolmarket" has been adopted, as can be observed at "Woolmarket Elementary School", and in official documents published by Harrison County government.

A post office operated under the name Wool Market from 1889 to 1911 and under the name Woolmarket Rural Station from 1969 to 1982.

Notable person
 Sandra Rushing, women's college basketball coach

References

Unincorporated communities in Harrison County, Mississippi
Unincorporated communities in Mississippi
Gulfport–Biloxi metropolitan area